Definitely Neighbors (also known as Neighbor Enemies) is a 2010 South Korean television drama starring Son Hyun-joo, Yoo Ho-jeong, Kim Sung-ryung and Shin Sung-rok. It aired on SBS from March 13 to October 31, 2010 on Saturdays and Sundays at 20:50 for 65 episodes.

Plot
A divorced couple become next-door neighbors.

Cast
Son Hyun-joo as Kim Sung-jae
Yoo Ho-jeong as Yoon Ji-young
Kim Sung-ryung as Kang Mi-jin
Shin Sung-rok as Jang Geun-hee
Kim Mi-sook as Chae Young-shil
Han Chae-ah as Yoon Ha-young
Choi Won-young as Chae Ki-hoon
Kim Ye-ryeong as Jang Se-hee
Park Young-ji as Geun-hee's father
Hong Yo-seob as Kim Woo-jin
Park Geun-hyung as Yoon In-soo
Jung Jae-soon as Lee Sun-ok
Ban Hyo-jung as Lee Jung-soon
Ahn Eun-jung as Kim Eun-seo
Cha Jae-dol as Song Joon-se
Lee Hye-sook as Han Soo-hee
Joo Ho as Lee Nam-shik
Park Sang-hoon as Sang-gyu
Jung Soo-in as Yoo-jin

Awards
2010 SBS Drama Awards 
Human Drama Award
Top Excellence Award, Actor in a Weekend/Daily Drama: Son Hyun-joo
Top Excellence Award, Actress in a Weekend/Daily Drama: Yoo Ho-jeong
Best Supporting Actor in a Weekend/Daily Drama: Shin Sung-rok
New Star Award: Han Chae-ah

See also
Seoul Broadcasting System

References

External links
Definitely Neighbors official SBS website 

Seoul Broadcasting System television dramas
2010 South Korean television series debuts
2010 South Korean television series endings
Korean-language television shows
South Korean romance television series
Television series by HB Entertainment